Air Bud: Spikes Back (also known as Air Bud 5) is a 2003 sports comedy film directed by Mike Southon. It is the fifth and final film in the original Air Bud series. The film series itself was followed by a spin-off series: the Air Buddies franchise. It was the only Air Bud movie not to include Kevin Zegers. It was released on June 24, 2003.

Plot
Buddy finds that he also has the uncanny ability to play volleyball. Throughout this experience he and a talking parrot stop some crooks named Doug and Gordon. Andrea attempts to earn money to fly out to California to visit Tammy after her family must move there. Josh has decided to play football at college for the summer instead of returning home for summer vacation.

Cast
 Katija Pevec as Andrea Framm
 Jake D. Smith as Noah Sullivan
 Tyler Boissonnault as Connor
 Cynthia Stevenson as Jackie Framm Sullivan
 Edie McClurg as Gram Gram
 Alf Humphreys as Dr. Patrick Sullivan
 Chantal Strand as Tammy
 C. Ernst Harth as Phil
 Ellen Kennedy as Wilma
 Patrick Cranshaw as Sheriff Bob
 Nancy Robertson as Principal Pickle
 Doug Funk as Mailman Phil
 Rob Tinkler as Doug
 Malcolm Scott as Gordon
 Brian Dobson as Polly
 Gabrielle Reece as herself

Production

Release
The movie was released directly to DVD on June 24, 2003 by Buena Vista Home Entertainment. The movie was reissued by Disney on June 16, 2008 in a double-pack alongside Air Bud: Seventh Inning Fetch.

Mill Creek Entertainment reissued the movie on January 14, 2020 on a 2-disc boxset, also containing other Air Bud movies owned by Air Bud Entertainment.

References

External links
 
 
 

Disney direct-to-video films
2003 direct-to-video films
2003 films
Direct-to-video sequel films
Films about dogs
Volleyball films
Films about animals playing sports
Films shot in Vancouver
Air Bud (series)
2000s English-language films
Films about animals
American children's comedy films
American direct-to-video films
DHX Media films
2003 directorial debut films
Canadian children's comedy films
Canadian sports comedy films
Canadian sequel films
Canadian direct-to-video films
2000s American films
2000s Canadian films